Shahid Motahhari Metro Station is a station on Shiraz Metro Line 1. The station opened on 10 February 2016. It is located on Zargari Junction between Afifabad Metro Station and Qasrodasht Metro Station.

Shiraz Metro stations
Railway stations opened in 2016